1st Panzer Division may refer to:

 1st Panzer Division (Wehrmacht)
 1st Panzer Division (Bundeswehr)
 1st SS Panzer Division Leibstandarte SS Adolf Hitler